Delayed parenthood is denoted:
Advanced maternal age for women
Paternal age effect for men